Julia Bliss is a Russian actress, model and DJ.

Early life and career
Bliss was born in Russia and completed her graduation in IT and management from Omsk University. Julia begin her Bollywood career in 2008 with her debut film Ghost which released in January 2012.

Filmography
 Ghost (lead role)
 Maattrraan (as Nadia)

References

Living people
Actors from Omsk
Russian film actresses
Female models from Omsk
Russian DJs
Russian expatriates in India
Actresses in Hindi cinema
Actresses in Tamil cinema
European actresses in India
Actresses of European descent in Indian films
Women DJs
21st-century Russian actresses
Year of birth missing (living people)